The invasion of Poland was the 1939 joint invasion of Poland by Nazi Germany, the Soviet Union, the Free City of Danzig, and a small Slovak contingent, that marked the beginning of World War II.

Invasion of Poland may also refer to:
World War II
German invasion of Poland, 1939
Slovak invasion of Poland, 1939
Soviet invasion of Poland, 1939
Soviet invasion of Poland (1920)
Polish–Russian War of 1792
Second Swedish invasion of Poland, 1702–1706
Battle of Hodów, 1694 invasion of Poland by the Crimean Khanate
Battle of Khotyn (1673), 1673 invasion of Poland by Ottoman Turks
Swedish invasion of Poland,  1655–1660
Battle of Khotyn (1621), 1621 invasion of Poland by Ottoman Turks
1589 invasion of Poland by the Crimean Khanate
Third Mongol invasion of Poland
Second Mongol invasion of Poland
First Mongol invasion of Poland